Waldren is a surname. Notable people with the surname include:

Dino Waldren (born 1991), American rugby union player 
Evelyn Waldren (1908–1986), American pilot
Murray Waldren, Australian journalist, editor, and writer

See also
Walden (name)
Walgren